Sergei Yuryevich Kostin (born 15 June 1991) is a Russian football defender who plays for FC Leningradets Leningrad Oblast.

Club career
Kostin made his debut in the Russian Second Division for FC Petrotrest Saint Petersburg on 22 April 2012 in a game against FC Sheksna Cherepovets.

He made his Russian Football National League debut for FC Petrotrest Saint Petersburg on 9 July 2012 in a game against FC Ural Yekaterinburg.

References

External links
 Career summary by sportbox.ru  
 

1991 births
Footballers from Saint Petersburg
Living people
Russian footballers
Russia youth international footballers
Association football defenders
FC Petrotrest players
FC Dynamo Saint Petersburg players
PFC Spartak Nalchik players
FC Sokol Saratov players
FC Tekstilshchik Ivanovo players
FC Zenit Saint Petersburg players
FC Leningradets Leningrad Oblast players